His Athletic Wife is a 1913 short film starring Wallace Beery, Gertrude Forbes and Robert Bolder.  This is currently believed to have been Beery's first film in his 36-year career of acting in more than 250 films.

Cast
Wallace Beery	...	
Mr. Strong
Gertrude Forbes	...	
Mrs. Strong
Robert Bolder	...	
The Policeman

External links
 His Athletic Wife in the Internet Movie Database

1913 films
1913 comedy films
American black-and-white films
American silent short films
Silent American comedy films
1913 short films
American comedy short films
1910s American films